Tom Hanlon may refer to:
 Tom Hanlon (athlete) (born 1967), Scottish athlete in steeplechase
 Tom Hanlon (politician) (born 1945), American politician in the Oregon House of Representatives

See also
 Tommy Hanlon Jr. (1923–2003), American-born actor and television host in Australia
 Tom Hanlin (1907–1953), Scottish fiction writer